Alex Fernandes may refer to:

 Alex Fernandes (footballer, born 1973), Brazilian football striker
 Alex Fernandes (footballer, born 2002), Brazilian football midfielder for Cherno More

See also
 Alex Fernandez (disambiguation)